RSMA, RSM-A and similar may refer to:

 Regenerative Satellite Mesh - A, internationally standardized satellite communications protocol
 Regimental Sergeant Major of the Army (RSM-A)
 Reverse polarity SMA connector (RSMA, RPSMA or RP-SMA)
 Road Safety Markings Association, a British trade association
 Royal Society of Marine Artists

See also
 RSMAS